In the liturgical traditions of Western Christianity, the Epistle side is the term used to designate the side of a church on which the Epistle is read during a church service.  It is the right-hand side of the chancel as viewed by the congregation from the nave.

The Gospel side is the other side of the chancel, where the Gospel is read. Facing the altar from the nave, it is the left-hand side. In some places, especially if a comment is based on a romance language source, the Gospel side will be cited as the Evangelist side.

In Lutheran and many Anglican churches, a pulpit is found on the Gospel side (the side left of the altar) from which the pastor reads the Gospel and preaches the sermon; a lectern is found on the Epistle side (the side right of the altar) from which readers read aloud the other Scripture lessons, such as the Epistle. The same occurs in Methodist parishes with a divided chancel though not in Methodist parishes designed with a pulpit-centered chancel that features a central pulpit that is situated behind the communion table (as with other Anglican and Presbyterian churches). Within the Catholic Church, in the Tridentine Mass, which is still in use among some communities, the lectern holding the Missal is moved from the Epistle side of the altar to the Gospel side after the reading of the Epistle.

Gallery

See also
 Decani

References

Church architecture
Mass (liturgy)